Alex Geovany Ávila Pineda (born 26 December 1964) is a retired Honduran football player who is known for playing with Honduran clubs Real España and Motagua.

Club career
Ávila started his career at Real España and scored 72 Honduran league goals for 4 clubs over 13 years. On 5 March 1992 he scored the only goal for Motagua against his former club to win the championship final. He also had a spell in Mexico.

He was Honduran league top goalscorer with Motagua in 1994–95, scoring 13 goals in 13 matches.

International career
Ávila made his debut for Honduras in an April 1988 friendly match against Mexico and has earned a total of 6 caps, scoring no goals. He has represented his country at the 1991 CONCACAF Gold Cup.

His final international was a June 1995 friendly match against Turkey.

Retirement
In 2011, he was coaching juniors in Charlotte, USA.

References

External links

 

1964 births
Living people
Association football forwards
Honduran footballers
Honduras international footballers
1991 CONCACAF Gold Cup players
Real C.D. España players
F.C. Motagua players
Cruz Azul footballers
C.F. Pachuca players
Platense F.C. players
Honduran expatriate footballers
Honduran expatriate sportspeople in Mexico
Expatriate footballers in Mexico
Liga Nacional de Fútbol Profesional de Honduras players
Liga MX players
Place of birth missing (living people)